Ancylosis gracilella is a species of snout moth in the genus Ancylosis. It was described by Émile Louis Ragonot, in 1887. It is found in Spain and North Macedonia, as well as Turkey.

The wingspan is 14–17 mm.

References

Moths described in 1887
gracilella
Moths of Europe
Moths of Asia